Muhammad: A Prophet For Our Time is a 2006 non-fiction book by the British writer Karen Armstrong. It is part of the "Eminent Lives" series, which are short biographies of famous people by well-known writers. It is Armstrong's second biography of Muhammad. Her first biography Muhammad: a Biography of the Prophet earned her the Muslim Public Affairs Council Media Award. Muhammad: A Prophet For Our Time is a short biography that shows how most Muslims understand Muhammad and their faith. In the book, Armstrong depicts Muhammad as both a mystic and a wise political and social reformer.

References

External links 
Excerpt from ''Muhammad: A Prophet For Our Time

2006 non-fiction books
Biographies of Muhammad
Works by Karen Armstrong
HarperCollins books